Avsallar is a belde (town, municipality) in the Alanya district of Antalya Province, Turkey.

Geography 

The population of Avsallar was 9527  .

History 
It's believed that Avsallar was founded by a group of Oghuz Turks belonging to the Avshar tribe from Kençek Señir (a historical settlement in Talas Province of Kyrgyzstan) in the 15th century. The name Avsallar is thought to be a corrupted form of Avsharlar (-lar is a Turkic plural suffix). The earlier settlement was to the north of the present Avsallar. In 1843 following a fire, the people moved to present location. In 1986 Avsallar was declared a seat of township.

Economy 
The economy of the town depends on tourism and citrus farming. But because of new hotel constructions the proportion of land allocated to farming is shrinking.

International relations

Twin towns – Sister cities
Avsallar is twinned with:
 Nowy Sącz, Poland

References

Populated places in Antalya Province
Towns in Turkey
Alanya District
Populated coastal places in Turkey